Two ships of the Imperial German Navy, and one of the Prussian Navy, have borne the name SMS Vineta, named after the mythic city of Vineta :

  was a steam frigate built in 1863 (:de:SMS Vineta (1863)).
  was a protected cruiser launched  in 1897.
  was an auxiliary cruiser outfitted for commerce raiding in the First World War 
  

German Navy ship names